, referred to as "La Salle" by most, is a private boys' school for secondary education located in Kagoshima, Kagoshima Prefecture, Japan. It is known as a preparatory school to enter the universities with difficult entrance exams in Japan. De La Salle Brothers runs this school.

La Salle Senior High School 
La Salle senior high school was established in Kagoshima in 1950.

La Salle Junior High School 
La Salle junior high school was established in 1955.

Notable alumni

Entertainment
Shun Nakahara, film director
LaSalle Ishii, actor and Owarai tarento
Peter, openly gay actor and dancer
Daihachi Yoshida, film director

Politics & Government

National Diet
Kazuaki Miyaji, former member of the House of Representatives
Koriki Jojima, former member 
Takeshi Iwaya, current member and former Minister of Defense
Yasushi Furukawa, current member of former governor of Saga Prefecture
Hiroshi Kawauchi, former member
Yoshihisa Furukawa, current member
Tetsuro Nomura, member of the House of Councillors

Governors
Yūichirō Itō, former governor of Kagoshima Prefecture
Kōichi Shiota, current governor of Kagoshima Prefecture
Yoshinori Yamaguchi, current governor of Saga Prefecture

Other
Nariaki Nakayama, leader of Kibō no Tō
Hiroshi Maruyama, current ambassador to Estonia and Finland

Science & Culture
Masazumi Harada, medical researcher
Hiroshi Nishihara, chemist
Izumi Tabata, health scientist
Sunao Yoshida, novelist
Hideyuki Arata, engineer

In popular culture
Riku Onda's 2000 novel Neverland and its 2001 TBS adaptation are implied to be set at La Salle.
An NHK documentary entitled Wakamonotachi wa Ima was shot at the school from 1974 to 1978.

References

External links 
 

High schools in Kagoshima Prefecture
Private schools in Japan
Catholic secondary schools in Japan